Keaton Sutherland (born February 12, 1997) is an American football offensive guard for the Washington Commanders of the National Football League (NFL). He played college football at Texas A&M.

College career
Sutherland played four seasons for the Texas A&M Aggies and joined the team as an early enrollee. He was named the Aggies starting right guard going into his true freshman season and played in all 13 of the team's games, starting seven of them. Sutherland had surgery to repair an injured shoulder after his freshman season and missed spring practice and lost his starting position. 

Sutherland eventually regained his starters spot for the final four games of his sophomore season, playing in eight games total. He started the first six games of his junior year at right tackle before undergoing an appendectomy during the bye week. He did not miss a game and returned to start the rest of the season at left guard.

Professional career

Cincinnati Bengals
Sutherland signed with the Cincinnati Bengals as an undrafted free agent on April 27, 2019. He was waived at the end of training camp but was re-signed to the team's practice squad on September 1, 2019. He was promoted to the active roster on September 17, 2019 and made his NFL debut on September 22, against the Buffalo Bills. He was waived on September 25.

Miami Dolphins
On September 26, 2019, Sutherland was claimed off waivers by the Miami Dolphins. On September 5, 2020, Sutherland was waived by the Dolphins.

Cincinnati Bengals (second stint)
On September 8, 2020, Sutherland was signed to the Cincinnati Bengals practice squad. He was promoted to the active roster on September 28, 2020. On August 31, 2021, Sutherland was waived by the Bengals and re-signed to the practice squad the next day.

San Francisco 49ers
On March 8, 2022, Sutherland signed with the San Francisco 49ers. He was waived on August 30, 2022 and signed to the practice squad the next day. He was released on September 13, 2022.

Washington Commanders
On October 4, 2022, Sutherland signed with the Washington Commanders' practice squad. He signed a reserve/future contract on January 9, 2023.

References

External links 
 Washington Commanders bio
 Texas A&M Aggies bio

1997 births
Living people
Players of American football from Texas
Sportspeople from the Dallas–Fort Worth metroplex
American football offensive guards
American football offensive tackles
People from Flower Mound, Texas
Texas A&M Aggies football players
Cincinnati Bengals players
Miami Dolphins players
San Francisco 49ers players
Washington Commanders players